Bastards is the eleventh studio album by British rock band Motörhead. It was released on 29 November 1993 via ZYX Music, the band's only release on this label.

Recording
It is one of two studio albums with the short-lived Lemmy, Würzel, Zööm and Mikkey Dee lineup, as on the previous album Dee was a 'special guest' drummer and had not officially joined the band. It was also the first of four Motörhead albums to be produced by former Child'ƨ Play producer Howard Benson, and the first Motörhead studio album not to contain a title track. After unsuccessfully commercialising the success of 1916 with its 1992 follow-up March ör Die, the band returned to their roots: being loud and fast. The lyrical themes range from social criticism ("On Your Feet or on Your Knees"), to war ("Death or Glory" and "I am the Sword") to child abuse ("Don't Let Daddy Kiss Me") and total mayhem ("Burner"). Lemmy also states in his memoir that he offered "Don't Let Daddy Kiss Me" to both Joan Jett and Lita Ford:

Release
It was barely released outside of the label's home country of Germany, other than the originally released series worldwide, until the 2001 Steamhammer reissue, and had to be imported otherwise. Bastards is cited by the band as one of their best works. In the documentary The Guts and the Glory, guitarist Phil Campbell enthuses:

In his autobiography White Line Fever, frontman Lemmy calls it:

However, he laments that the band's record label, the German-based ZYX, did not promote it outside of Germany.

The song "Born to Raise Hell" was later re-recorded with Ice-T and Ugly Kid Joe vocalist Whitfield Crane and released as a single (including a version on picture disc). This version of the song was featured in the movie Airheads.

Artwork
Joe Petagno, long-time Motörhead sleeve artist, revealed in a rare interview on the Inferno 30th Anniversary edition bonus DVD that the album was originally to be titled Devils. He had already drawn up a cover to reflect this title when it was changed. As well as alluding to the original name of the album, Petagno also had this insight into the concept of the album cover:

Reception

Bastards reached number 28 in Germany and also charted in Sweden and Japan. The AllMusic review states:

Ultimate Classic Rock ranked Bastards as the fourth-best Motörhead album, commenting:

Track listing

Personnel
Per the album's liner notes.
 Lemmy – vocals, bass guitars, acoustic guitar
 Phil "Zööm" Campbell – lead guitars, acoustic guitar
 Würzel – lead guitars, rhythm guitar
 Mikkey Dee – drums

Additional musician
 Howard Benson – ritchy keyboards

Production
 Howard Benson – producer, mixing
 Ryan Dorn – engineer, mixing
 John Aguto – assistant engineer
 Randy Wine – assistant engineer
 Darrin Mann – assistant engineer
 John Gaudesi – assistant engineer
 Gregg Barrett – assistant engineer
 Devin Foutz – assistant engineer
 Eddy Schreyer – mastering
Henri Clausei – photography
 Lisa Lake – art design and layout
 Connie Williamson – art design and layout
 Joe Petagno – Snaggletooth, album cover

Charts

References

External links
 Motorhead official website

Motörhead albums
1993 albums
Albums with cover art by Joe Petagno
Albums produced by Howard Benson